Dieterode is a municipality in the district Eichsfeld,  Thuringia, Germany. It is part of the municipal association Ershausen/Geismar.

Situation 
Dieterode, is situated eight kilometers south west of Heilbad Heiligenstadt between Höheberg and Rachelsberg. Neighbouring communities are Kalteneber (north east), Rüstungen, Schwobfeld (to the south) and Eichstruth (to the west).

History 
The place is said to be firstly mentioned 1184 or 1251 as "Diethenroth". The church, built in 1520, was newly built in 1785. In 1914, railway reached Dieterode. (Schwebda). Due to Inner German border closing, railway traffic ended in 1947. The rails were dismantled.

Demography  

 Source: Thüringian Statistics Office

Politics

Community council 
The Dieterode community council comprises 6 members.

The election proposal list of FFw (FFw = Voluntary Fire brigade) won all 6 seats (Date: 7. Juni 2009)

Mayor 
The (voluntary) mayor Uwe Günther (FFw) was first elected in 1994, and re-elected in 1999, 2004, 2010 and 2016.

Tourist attractions 

 Catholic church „St. Georg“, built 1785
 Former railway station Dieterode; almost originally status

References

External links 

  community web site

Eichsfeld (district)